JCSAT-RA, previously known as JCSAT-12, is a Japanese geostationary communications satellite, which is operated by SKY Perfect JSAT Group.

Details
It was ordered to replace the JCSAT-11 satellite which was lost in a launch failure on a Proton-M/Briz-M rocket in 2007, and is currently used as an on-orbit spare satellite; a role in which it replaced the older JCSAT-R spacecraft, providing a reserve for if one of the company's other satellites fails. It is a  satellite, which was constructed by Lockheed Martin based on the A2100AX satellite bus, with the same configuration as JCSAT-10 and JCSAT-11. The contract to build JCSAT-12 was awarded on 6 September 2007, the day after JCSAT-11 failed to reach orbit.

It was launched, along with the Australian Optus D3 satellite, by Arianespace. An Ariane 5ECA rocket was used for the launch, which occurred from ELA-3 at the Guiana Space Centre in Kourou, French Guiana. The launch took place at 22:09 GMT on 21 August 2009, at the start of a 60-minute launch window.

JCSAT-12 separated from its carrier rocket into a geosynchronous transfer orbit, from which raise itself to geostationary orbit using a LEROS-1C apogee motor. It has a design life of fifteen years, and carries forty two transponders; twelve G/H band, and thirty J band (US IEEE C and Ku bands respectively).

See also

2009 in spaceflight

References

Spacecraft launched in 2009
Satellites using the A2100 bus
Communications satellites of Japan
Satellites of Japan